Profunditerebra anseeuwi is a species of sea snail, a marine gastropod mollusk in the family Terebridae, the auger snails.

Description

Distribution
This marine species occurs in the Solomon Sea.

References

 Terryn Y. (2005) Terebra anseeuwi sp. nov., a new Terebridae species from the Philippines. Visaya 1(5): 139–142.

External links
 Fedosov, A. E.; Malcolm, G.; Terryn, Y.; Gorson, J.; Modica, M. V.; Holford, M.; Puillandre, N. (2020). Phylogenetic classification of the family Terebridae (Neogastropoda: Conoidea). Journal of Molluscan Studies

Terebridae
Gastropods described in 2005